Cephaloleia varabilis is a species of rolled-leaf beetle in the family Chrysomelidae, first found in Colombia and Panama.

References

Arthropods of Colombia
Cassidinae